MACAM, the Modern And Contemporary Art Museum, opened in June 2013, in a factory compound in Alita. Owned and operated by a Lebanese NGO holding the same name, this Museum is dedicated to preserving and promoting Lebanese modern and contemporary art.

History
The museum presents a selection of 400 sculptures and installations created by 65 artists born or having lived in Lebanon. It organises regular events highlighting Lebanese artists and inviting new audiences to discover Lebanese art.

Permanent displays
The museum's permanent collections are distributed in two halls, one dedicated to Lebanese sculpture and the other to Lebanese installations. Many works are either on loan or offered to the Museum by the artists or their family.

The Sculpture Hall
The collection is organised according to the material used by the sculptor. In the wood sculptures room, one finds works by Youssef Basbous, Salwa Raouda Shoucair, Charles Khoury, Mouazzaz Rawda, Marwan Saleh, Ibrahim Zod and Mohamad Darwish Sakr. In the stone sculptures room, works by Ezzat Mezher, Wajih Nahle, Michel Basbous, Elias Bazouni, Hussein Madi and Alfred Basbous are exhibited. In the Steel and Bronze room, one can discover a selection of the works of Ginane Makki Bacho, Raffoul Chahine, Leila Jabre-Jureidini, Zaven.
There's also a section dedicated to Lebanese ceramic artists with works by Dorothy Salhab Kazemi, May Aboud and Neville Assad Salha.

The Installation Hall
This hall features work by Mona Sehanoui, Ziad Abillama, Nabil Helou, Raouf Rifai, Mario Saba and Nicole Younes.

Projects

Retrospectives of Lebanese sculptors
Each year, MACAM honours a Lebanese sculptor whose work has marked the country's art scene. In 2014, it exhibited a large selection of Zaven's work. He is renowned for his monumental bronze work, but also for his small bronze cast sculptures. Later the same year, it honoured Youssef Basbous who worked extensively on wood. In 2015, MACAM honoured Boulos Richa, an artist who trained as a blacksmith, and who transforms scraps of iron into figurative art.

Yearly sculpture competition
In 2013, MACAM organised "The Age of Bronze" competition in which artists were invited to present a sculpture that the Museum would cast in bronze, if they won the competition. In 2014, the competition was between wood sculptures, as part of the "Age of Wood". In 2015, the competition was themed the "Age of Iron".

Publications

Lebanese Artists
 Rudy Rahme
Boulos Richa
 Loti Adaimi
 Alfred Basbous
 Joseph Basbous
 Chawky Frenn
 Samia Halaby
 Halim Jurdak
 Helen Khal
 Jamil Molaeb
 Khalil Mufarrij
 Krikor Norikian
 Samia Oseiran-Junblat
 Mazen Rifai

Lebanese Art
 Nammour, C., Sculpture in Lebanon, Fine Arts Publishing, Beirut, 1990.
 Nammour, C., In Front of Painting, FIne Arts Publishing, Beirut, 2003.
 Khal, H., Resonances - 82 Lebanese Artists Reviewed, Fine Arts Publishing, Beirut, 2011.

Other publications
 Schaub, G., Cedrus Libani – The Cedar of Lebanon, Fine Arts Publishing, Beirut, 2012.

Brochures
 Beirut Art Book Fair (2009)
 Beirut Art Book Fair (2010)
 Beirut Art Book Fair (2011)
 Beirut Art Book Fair (2013)

Newsletter
 MACAM news, a monthly newsletter, which gives an account of the Museum's activities.

Visitor information
The museum is open every Friday, Saturday and Sunday, from 12 am to 6 pm.
On appointment, it can be opened for groups on Tuesdays, Wednesdays and Thursdays.
MACAM is closed on Mondays.

References

External links
 MACAM

Museums in Beirut
Art museums established in 2013
2013 establishments in Lebanon